Washington Square Review (usually shortened to ON SQU) is a nationally distributed literary magazine that publishes stories, poems, essays and reviews, many of which are later reprinted in annual anthologies. It is the graduate equivalent of NYU Local and Washington Square News.

Founded in 1996, the journal is based at New York University and edited by students of the university's Graduate Creative Writing Program.  The Washington Square Review sponsors an annual literary contest and hosts biannual benefit readings in New York City.

Notable contributors

John Ashbery
Meghan O'Rourke
Edward Hirsch
Charles Simic
Lauren Groff
Rachel Zucker
Rebecca Wolff
Joe Meno
Dorothea Lasky
Rivka Galchen

Jesse Ball
Dan Chiasson
Steve Almond
Jacob M. Appel
Ben Lerner
Rick Moody
Sarah Manguso
Philip Levine
Amy Hempel

Anne Carson
Stephen Dunn
Eamon Grennan
Etgar Keret
Lydia Davis
Kimiko Hahn
Elisa Albert
Mark Doty
Catherine Lacey

Yusef Komunyakaa
Jess Row
Paul Muldoon
Wells Tower
Darin Strauss
Alice Notley
Sharon Olds
John Hodgman
Shane Jones

Awards
Amy Hempel's short story, "The Chicane," from Issue 37 (Spring 2016), was anthologized in Best American Short Stories 2017.

Editors
The Masthead:

Editor-In-Chief: Joanna Yas
Managing Editor: Katie Bockino
Assistant Managing Editor: Alisson Wood
Fiction Editor: Alyssa diPierro
Assistant Fiction Editors: Spencer Gaffney and Sonia Feigelson
Poetry Editors: Maggie Millner and Maddie Mori
Assistant Poetry Editor: Hannah Hirsh
Web Editors: Hannah Gilham and T.J. Smith
Assistant Web Editors: Nadra Mabrouk, Caitlin Barasch and Katie Rejsek
Interview Editors: Rachel Mannheimer and Eleanor Wright
Assistant Interview Editor: Elizabeth Dubois
International Editors: Mallory Imler Powell and Momina Mela 
Assistant International Editors: Silvina Lopex Medin and Brittany Shutts
Copy Editors: Matthew Chow and Megan Swenson
Art Editor: Wallace Ludel

See also
List of literary magazines

Notes

External links
 

Biannual magazines published in the United States
Magazines established in 1996
Magazines published in New York City
New York University
Online literary magazines published in the United States
Student magazines published in the United States